Pedro Viola (born June 29, 1983) is a Dominican professional baseball pitcher. He played in Major League Baseball (MLB) for the Cincinnati Reds and Baltimore Orioles. He was called up to MLB on September 2, 2009, after was 2–2 with a 5.47 ERA and converted eight of 11 save chances for the Triple-A Louisville Bats.

Career

Cincinnati Reds
Viola has played for teams on every minor league level in the Reds organization, some of which have since ended affiliation with the Reds. He played for the DSL Reds, Sarasota Reds, Dayton Dragons and Chattanooga Lookouts before Louisville.

Viola made his MLB debut with the Reds on September 8 at Coors Field against the Colorado Rockies, pitching in the sixth and seventh innings in relief of starter Matt Maloney. He gave up a home run to Eric Young, Jr. to lead off the sixth inning, Young's first career homer. Viola also allowed a Todd Helton single during the inning. He walked and struck out one batter each in the seventh, en route to a 3-1 Rockies victory.

Baltimore Orioles
Viola was claimed off waivers by the Baltimore Orioles on April 21, 2010. After joining the Orioles he spent most of his time in Double AA Bowie but has been called up on 2 occasions.

Oakland Athletics
In 2013, he signed a minor league contract with the Oakland Athletics and pitched for the AAA Sacramento River Cats

International career
He was selected to the Dominican Republic national baseball team at the 2009 World Baseball Classic, 2019 Pan American Games Qualifier and 2019 Pan American Games.

References

External links

1983 births
Living people
Baltimore Orioles players
Baseball players at the 2019 Pan American Games
Bowie Baysox players
Chattanooga Lookouts players
Cincinnati Reds players
Dayton Dragons players
Dominican Summer League Reds players
Dominican Republic expatriate baseball players in the United States
Gigantes del Cibao players
Louisville Bats players
Major League Baseball pitchers
Major League Baseball players from the Dominican Republic
Midland RockHounds players
Navegantes del Magallanes players
Norfolk Tides players
People from San Juan de la Maguana
Peoria Javelinas players
Sacramento River Cats players
Sarasota Reds players
Stockton Ports players
World Baseball Classic players of the Dominican Republic
2009 World Baseball Classic players
Pan American Games competitors for the Dominican Republic
Dominican Republic expatriate baseball players in Venezuela